Castle Yankee was the code name given to one of the tests in the Operation Castle series of American tests of thermonuclear bombs. It was originally intended as a test of a TX-16/EC-16 Jughead bomb, but the design became obsolete after the Castle Bravo test was successful. The test device was replaced with a TX-24/EC-24 Runt II bomb which was detonated on May 5, 1954, at Bikini Atoll.
It released energy equivalent to 13.5 megatons of TNT, the second-largest yield ever in a U.S. fusion weapon test.

Jughead
Yankee was originally intended to be a test of a TX-16/EC-16, a weaponized version of the large and complex Ivy Mike device. A small number of emergency capability EC-16s were produced, without being tested, to provide a stop-gap thermonuclear weapon capability in response to the Russian nuclear weapons program.

The test device, code-named Jughead, had been prepared as a backup in case the non-cryogenic Castle Bravo Shrimp device failed to work. The test of Jughead was cancelled when the Bravo test was successful, and the cryogenic EC-16s were withdrawn and dismantled.

Runt II
Jughead was replaced by the Runt II device (a TX-24/EC-24), developed from the Castle Romeo Runt device (a TX-17/EC-17). Externally identical, the principal difference between them was in the fuel for the fusion stage. While Runt used natural lithium (with 7.5% of the Lithium-6 isotope), Runt II used the same partially enriched lithium (approximately 40% Lithium-6) as the Shrimp device of Castle Bravo.

It was detonated on May 5, 1954, at Bikini Atoll of the Marshall Islands, on a barge moored in the middle of the crater from the Castle Union test.

Although it had been predicted to produce a yield of 6 to 10 megatons, it actually produced a yield of 13.5 megatons, the second-largest ever yield in a U.S. fusion weapon test. Like the Mike, Bravo and Romeo tests, a large percentage of the yield was produced by fast fission of the natural uranium tamper. Of the total yield, 7 megatons were from fission; the other 6.5 megatons were from fusion reactions. The high fusion yield was due to the enriched fuel and set a U.S. record that stood until Hardtack Poplar in 1958.

External links
 
 
 
 Operation Castle

References
 Chuck Hansen, U. S. Nuclear Weapons: The Secret History (Arlington: AeroFax, 1988)

Explosions in 1954
Nuclear testing at Bikini Atoll
1954 in military history
1954 in the environment
1950s in the Marshall Islands
1954 in the Trust Territory of the Pacific Islands
Articles containing video clips
May 1954 events in Oceania